The Samuel Ogbemudia Stadium is a multi-use stadium in Benin City, Nigeria.  Originally known as Ogbe Stadium, it is currently used mostly for football matches and is the home stadium of Bendel Insurance FC and Edo Queens FC. 

The stadium has a capacity of 12,000 people after extensive renovation by the Governor Godwin Obaseki-led administration in 2018.

It is named after the two-time Governor of the old Bendel State, Dr. Samuel Ogbemudia.  In Feb. 2009, the stadium was banned by the National League for having an unsafe, below-standard playing surface.

Since Adams Oshiomhole assumed office as governor in 2008, there have been significant changes in the stadium, like new FIFA approved turf playing pitch and so many others. In 2018, the Obaseki-led administration, in line with its Making Edo Great Again (MEGA) agenda, embarked on a total overhaul and reconstruction of the stadium’s facilities. All the seats in the previous 20,000-capacity stadium were replaced with modern ones, the synthetic grass in the pitch was replaced with natural grass and the tartan tracks replaced.  In the course of the reconstruction, drains were constructed to deal with the flooding challenge in the stadium.

Since the completion of renovations, Samuel Ogbemudia Stadium has hosted  national tournaments and competitions such as the 2020 National Sports Festival, the Betsy Obaseki Women Football Tournament and the Athletics Federation of Nigeria (AFN) trails for Commonwealth championship 

On the back of Obaseki’s reenactment of sports in the state, the home team of the Samuel Ogbemudia Stadium, Bendel Insurance, recently regained promotion to the Nigeria Premier Football League.

Senior International Games

See also
List of stadiums in Nigeria

References

Football venues in Nigeria
Benin City